Joseph J. Dowd (September 3, 1927 – October 6, 2007) was an American politician who served in the New York State Assembly from 1961 to 1970.

He died on October 6, 2007, in Remsenburg, New York at age 80.

References

1927 births
2007 deaths
Democratic Party members of the New York State Assembly
20th-century American politicians